Mohammed Osman Hassan Salih Wardi (19 July 1932 – 18 February 2012), also known as Mohammed Wardi, was a Nubian Sudanese singer, poet and songwriter. Looking back at his life and artistic career, Sudanese writer and critic Lemya Shammat called him an "inspirational figure in Sudanese music and culture, whose prolific talent and massive contribution remains unsurpassed in Sudan."

Early life
Wardi was born on 19 July 1932 in a small village called Sawarda close to Wadi Halfa in Northern Sudan. His mother, Batool Badri, died when he was an infant, and his father, Osman Hassan Wardi, died when he was nine years old. He was brought up in a diverse and culturally rich background and developed an interest in poetry, literature, music and singing. To complete his education, he moved to Shendi in Central Sudan, and returned to Wadi Halfa as a secondary school teacher.

Musical career
In 1953, Wardi went to Khartoum for the first time to attend a convention as a teaching representative for his area. After this, he moved to Khartoum and started his career as a musical performer. In 1957, Omdurman Radio chose him to record and sing on national broadcast in an arena with singers such as Abdelaziz Mohamed Daoud, Hassan Atia, Ahmed Almustafa, Osman Hussein and Ibrahim Awad. Wardi recorded 17 songs in his first year. and worked together with poet Ismail Hassan, resulting in more than 23 songs.

Wardi performed using a variety of instruments, including the Nubian kissar and sang in both Arabic and Nubian languages. He has been described as one of "Africa's top singers", with fans mainly in the Horn of Africa. His songs address topics such as romance, passion, Nubian folklore, heritage, revolution and patriotism, with some of his political songs resulting in him being jailed. He was aligned with the political left and a member of the Sudanese Communist Party (the largest in Africa during the Cold War).  After the military coup in 1989, he left Sudan for exile in Cairo and Los Angeles. In 1990, Wardi played a concert for 250,000 Sudanese refugees at a refugee camp in Itang, Ethiopia. He returned to Sudan in May 2002, and was awarded an honorary doctorate from the University of Khartoum in 2005.

Death
Wardi suffered from kidney failure later in his life. He eventually received a kidney transplant, after one of his fans donated a kidney to him in 2002. He died on 18 February 2012 and was buried in the Farouk Cemetery in Khartoum.

Poets and songwriters, with whom Wardi collaborated
 Abdel-Hadi Osman Ahmed
 Sawi Abdelkafi
 Aljayli Abdelmoneim
 Omer Altayib Ad-dosh – "Banadeha"
 Mubarak Basheer
 Mohamed Muftah Alfaytori
 Ishaq Alhalanqi – "A3z Alnas"
 Ahmed Altahir
 Ibrahim Alrasheed – "Saleem Alzog"
 Abdelrahman Alrayah
 Alsir Dolaib
 Abu Amna Hamid
 Ismail Hassan – "Alhaneen ya Foadi", "Nor Al3en", "Habenak mn Qlobna", "Almostaheel",
 Salah Ahmed Ibrahim – "Altayir Almohajir"
 Mohammed Almakki Ibrahim
 Haile
 Kamal Mahessi – "Jamal Aldoniya"
 Mohammed Abu Qatati – "Almursal"
 Altijani Saeed – "Gult Arhal", " Min Gair Meiad"
 Mahjoub Sharif – "Ya Sha3ban Lahbt thwrtak", "Masajenak", "We Will Build It (The Alternative)" ("حنبنيهو")
 Saadaddin Ibrahim
 Mohammed Abdalla Mohammed Babekir

See also 
 Music of Sudan
 List of Sudanese singers

References

External links 
 Mohammed Wardi on discogs
Music video "We Will Build It (The Alternative)" ("حنبنيهو") by Mohammed Wardi with English translation and notes

Sudanese musicians
Sudanese people of Nubian descent
Nubian people
People from Northern (state)
1932 births
2012 deaths
Deaths from kidney failure
20th-century Sudanese artists
20th-century Sudanese male singers